The 1940 football season was São Paulo's 11th season since the club's founding in 1930.

Overall

{|class="wikitable"
|-
|Games played || 48 (8# Torneio Rio-São Paulo, 20# Campeonato Paulista, 23 Friendly match)
|-
|Games won || 20 (1# Torneio Rio-São Paulo, 9# Campeonato Paulista, 11 Friendly match)
|-
|Games drawn || 6 (2 Torneio Rio-São Paulo, 1 Campeonato Paulista, 3 Friendly match)
|-
|Games lost || 22 (5# Torneio Rio-São Paulo, 10# Campeonato Paulista, 9 Friendly match)
|-
|Goals scored || 115
|-
|Goals conceded || 107
|-
|Goal difference || +8
|-
|Best result || 8–0 (A) v Primeiro de Maio - Friendly match - 1940.04.21
|-
|Worst result || 1–8 (A) v Botafogo - Torneio Rio-São Paulo - 1940.07.10
|-
|Most appearances || 
|-
|Top scorer || 
|-

 # Match valid simultaneously for the Campeonato Paulista and Torneio Rio-São Paulo.

Friendlies

Official competitions

Campeonato Paulista

 # Match valid simultaneously for the Campeonato Paulista and Torneio Rio-São Paulo.

Record

Torneio Rio-São Paulo

 # Match valid simultaneously for the Campeonato Paulista and Torneio Rio-São Paulo.

Record

External links
official website 

Association football clubs 1940 season
1940
1940 in Brazilian football